Tokiwa Station (常盤駅) is the name of three train stations in Japan:

 Tokiwa Station (Kyoto)
 Tokiwa Station (Okayama)
 Tokiwa Station (Yamaguchi)